Kalju Kruusa (real name Jaanus Valk; born 10 October 1973, in Tallinn) is an Estonian poet, editor and  translator.

From 1993, he is studying at University of Tartu, Tallinn University and Waseda University (Tokyo). In 2008, he defended his BA thesis on the French symbolist poet Stéphane Mallarmé.

He is one of the founders of the literary group Erakkond ('Hermitkind'), established in 1996. With Hasso Krull, he founded in 2001 the poetry e-magazine Ninniku, being its co-editor until 2010.

Works
 1999: poetry collection "Meeleolu" ('Frame of Mind')
 2004: poetry collection "Treffamisi" ('Encounters')
 2010: poetry collection "Tühhja" ('Nothing')
 2015: poetry collection "Äädikkärbsed" ('Fruit Flies')

References

Living people
1973 births
Estonian male poets
21st-century Estonian poets
Estonian translators
Estonian editors
Writers from Tallinn
University of Tartu alumni
Tallinn University alumni
Waseda University alumni